Santa Fe Mysteries: The Elk Moon Murder is a video game, the first in the Santa Fe Mysteries series, followed by Santa Fe Mysteries: Sacred Ground. In The Elk Moon Murder, a famous Native American artist named Anna Elk Moon is murdered in the American Southwest.

Gameplay
The game is a full-motion video adventure game with a point-and-click interface. The player has five days to solve the mystery, and eight hours in each day .Certain actions use up a portion of the time. The player must "listen to the usual suspects, order forensics and shoot photos", and  create an arrest warrant by the end of the game.

Development
The game uses the same Activision game engine as Spycraft: The Great Game. The game was distributed by MarkSoft in Poland. The game's original American packaging, which was sent out as a review copy, featured a warning about "clothed 
sexual touching" on the cover.

The game was created by Shannon Gilligan, who had previously produced the successful Virtual Murder video game series. The game featured actors Amanda Donohoe, Marc Alaimo, and over a dozen Hollywood actors. The scenes were shot on location in Santa Fe, New Mexico.

The project was announced in Electronic Entertainment on September 21, 1995 and in Germany in Power Play Magazine in March 1995. In terms of commercial performance, PC Player speculated that The Elk Moon Murder sold satisfactorily to justify Activision creating a sequel to the title.

Reception

The game received mixed to positive reviews. Allgame found the game thrilling and enjoyed its strategic elements. MacGamer thought the game was too short in length and too sparse of interactive options. Though Just Adventure concluded that the game was crafted well, they also thought its lack of puzzles made it less of an adventure game. Adventure Classic Gaming negatively compared the game to the "equally uninspiring Virtual Murder series" as a whodunit adventure, and the Police Quest series as a police procedural adventure simulation. Programmer in Black recommended Under a Killing Moon, The Pandora Directive, The Dame Was Loaded, The Broken Sword, and Gabriel Knight as games with similar detective story elements. PC World said the game is a "classic whodunnit with clever scripting and fine acting". Just Adventure noted that the game was interesting, albeit a bit too complicated, especially at the beginning. Coming Soon Magazine complimented the graphics, sounds, storyline, and reasonable price, while responding negatively to the rambling dialogue from suspects. GameSpot recommended players purchase a paperback detective novel instead of this title. Adventure Gamers praised the game's used of Santa Fe as a backdrop to the story. Entertainment Weekly felt the title was "low-budget fare" when compared to The Pandora Directive. PC Zone thought the title was polished and professional, also describing it as superior fun. MacGamer felt the title fell short of Activision's earlier title Spycraft. Gambler Magazine noted the game had simple mechanics but complex gameplay. PC Games felt the multiple choice dialogue mechanic was boring in the long run, nevertheless in a separate issue the reviewer confessed " I can not fault [the game]" in terms of its technical elements. PC Player felt the title was extremely atmospheric and professionally acted, though the magazine negatively compared the game to Golden Gate Killer. PC Action praised the way the title comfortably records all collected information in its in-game journal.

Entertainment Weekly gave the game a C- and wrote that "The game's tag line reads, 'Fear the desert,' but what I really fear is that CD-ROMs like this are replicating cable TV's more arid terrain."

Reviews
PC Games - Oct, 1996
PC Player (Germany) - Aug, 1996
PC Zone - Aug 13, 2001
Adventure Gamers - Feb 27, 2004
Computer Gaming World - Oct, 1996
GameSpot - Aug 01, 1996

Legacy
Missing in Santa Fe is an online prequel to The Elk Moon Murder, featuring the same setting and many of the same characters. It was presented as an episodic narrative in three parts which commence on Tuesday, June 25, 1996, and continued each week. Additional evidence was presented on Tuesday, July 23. A contest was held with the winners receiving a trip to Santa Fe. The prequel was developed by Newfront Communications, who had previously worked on the mystery website The Case.

References

External links
 (archived)

Review in PC World

1996 video games
Activision games
Adventure games
Criminal law video games
DOS games
Full motion video based games
MacOS games
Single-player video games
Video games about police officers
Video games developed in the United States
Windows games